The Trade Unions International of Building, Wood, Building Materials and Industries, also known as the Trade Unions International of Construction, Wood, Building Materials and Industries, or by its French acronym UITBB (Union internationale des syndicats des travailleurs du bâtiment, du bois et des matériaux de construction) is a Trade Union International affiliated with the World Federation of Trade Unions.

History 

The UITBB was founded at a conference in Milan in 14–16 July 1949.

Organization 

The highest organization is the Conference which meets every 4 years. Between conferences, the union is run by an administrative committee. The committee elections the president, vice-presidents, secretary general and secretaries, who constitute the executive bureau. The secretariat is made up of the secretary general and secretaries who ran the day-to-day activities of the organization.

The organisation's headquarters was in Helsinki from at least 1955. Its address that year was reported to be Kainsaniamenk 5 A 14. In 1957 it was reported to be headquartered at 28B Fredrikinkatu, Box 281. By 1978 it was listed at Fredrikinkatu F28B13 Box10281, 00101 Helskini.  From 1985, the address was only listed as Post-office box 281 Helskini.  The headquarters have since moved to Nicosia in Cyprus.

Membership 

In 1978 the UITBB claimed 15 million members in 52 affiliated unions in 42 countries. In 1985 this had grown to 17 million members in 72 unions in 57 countries. By 2003, this had fallen to 2 million workers in 50 countries, growing again by 2020 to 2.5 million workers in 60 countries.

Member organizations as of 1978 included:

 - Fraktion Gewerkschaftlicher Linksblock in der Gewerkschaft der Bau-und Holzarbeiter
 - Building Workers Industrial Union of Australia
 - Syndicat National des Travailleurs du Batiment, du Bois et des Materiaux de Construction
 - Confederación Sindical de Trabajadores en Construcciones
 - Syndicat des Travailleurs du Batiment et des Materiaux de Construction
 - Syndicat des Travailleurs Forestiers et l'Industrie du Bois
 - Federación Industrial Nacional de la Edification, Madera, y Materiales de Construccion (in exile)
 - Federación Nacional de Trabojadores de la Industria de la Construccion, Cemento, y Materiales de Construccion
 - Fédération Syndicale des Travailleurs du Batiment et Travaux Publics
 - Sindicato Nacional de Trabajadores de Construccion, Madera y Materiales de Construccion
 - Sindicato Nacional de Trabajadores de los Construccion
 - Cyprus Building Wood General Workers Trade Union
 - Gewerkschaft der Werktatigen der Bau-und-Baumaterialien Industrie
 - Gewerkschaft der Werktätigen der Holzindustrie, Forst undWasserwirtschaft
 - Fédération de Trabajadores de la Construccion del Guayas
 - Construction Trade Union
 - National Federation of Construction Workers
 - Fédération nationale des Travailleurs du Bois et des Parties Similaires
 - Industrial Union of Construction and Wood
 - Syndicat CGTG des Travailleurs du Batiment, des Travaux Publics et Activities Annexes
 - Construction, Wood and Building Materials Industries Workers Union
 - Mysore Cements Employees Association
 - Central PWD Workers Union
 - Public Works Department (Union), Mazdoor Sabah of Uttar Pradesh
 - General Union of Building and Construction Workers
 - Italian Federation of Wood, Building and Industry Workers
 - General Syndicate of Building, Wood, Building Materials and Allied Industries (in exile)
 - All Japan Dayworkers Union
 - All Construction Ministry Workers Union
 - Construction and Forestry Workers Union
 - Union Interproffessionnelle des Travailleurs du Batiment du Bois et des Materiaux du Construction
 - Syndicat de la Metallurgie, du Bois et du Batiment
 - Syndicat National de l'Industrie du Batiment et des Materiaux du Construction
 - Syndicat des Ouviers du Batiment
 - Syndicat des Travailleurs de l'Industrie et du Batiment
 - Public Work Construction Technical and General Workers Union
 - Fédération Nacional de Trabajadores de la Construccion, Madera, Materiales de la Construction y Ramas Afines
 - Fédération de Trabajadores en Construccion Civil
 - Syndicat des Travailleurs de la Construction
 - Syndicat des Travailleurs de l'Industrie Forestiere et du Bois
 - Union des Syndicat du Batiment de l'Industrie des Materiaux du Construction
 - Union des Syndicat des Enterprises de l'Economie Forestiere
 - General Construction Workers Union
 - Syndicat des Travailleurs du Batiment et des Materiaux du Construction
 - Syndicat des Travailleurs Forestieres de l'Industrie du Papier et du Bois
 - Industrial and General Workers Union Workers Union
 - Mercantile and Local Industries Employees Union
 - Professional Federation of Building, and Wood Workers Trade Union
 - Syndicat du Batiment et des Travaux Publics Prives
 - Sindicato Unico Nacional de Trabajadores de la Construccion y Anexos
 - Syndicat National des Travailleurs du Batiment
 - General Union for the Workers of Building, Services and Light Industries

Publications 

The union published Information Bulletin quarterly in English, French, Spanish, Russian, German, Swedish and Finnish. According to one source it also published a "brief information circulars" five or six times a year. Another sources says it published "new briefs on a fortnightly basis.

Leadership

General Secretaries
1949: Yrjö Murto
1952: Aarne Saarinen
1955: Erkki Salomaa
1960: Veikko Porkkala
1983: Mauri Perä
1992: Jose Dinis
2010s: Michalis Papanikolaou

Presidents
Joseph Kobel
1957: Walter Tille
1960: Lothar Lindner
1990: Robert Brun

2020: Daniel Diveiro

See also 
Building and Wood Workers' International

References

External links 
Official website

Building
Trade unions established in 1949
Organisations based in Helsinki
Building and construction trade unions
1949 establishments in Italy